The olive green cutworm or girdler moth (Dargida procinctus) is a species of moth of the family Noctuidae. It is found from Wisconsin and Manitoba to British Columbia, south to California and Arizona.

The wingspan is about 40 mm. The moth flies from August to September in the north, but  much earlier in the southern parts of its range.

The larvae feed on various grasses, primarily Phalaris arundinacea.

External links
Moths of Maryland
Bug Guide

Hadeninae
Moths of North America